Lee Ryan (born 17 June 1983) is an English singer, songwriter and actor, best known as a member of the boy band Blue.

Ryan took part in the BBC series Strictly Come Dancing. He was partnered with professional dancer Nadiya Bychkova and was the second contestant to be eliminated on 7 October 2018. In 2019, Ryan starred in Celebs Go Dating on E4 and released his first single after nine years called "Ghost". Ryan subsequently released two further solo singles in 2020, "Mockingbirds" and "Swayed". 

Ryan reunited with Blue in 2011 and in 2022 they released singles "Haven't Found You Yet" and "Dance with Me" from their sixth studio album Heart & Soul.

Early life

Lee Ryan was born in Chatham, Kent. His parents split up when he was six years old. Ryan mostly lived with his mother, sister Gemma and his grandmother.  Ryan went to Bedonwell School before attending performing arts schools, including Welling School and the Independent Performing Arts School Belcanto London Academy (BLA), where he first developed his talent, then independent fee-paying theatre schools Sylvia Young Theatre School and Italia Conti Academy of Theatre Arts.

Career

2000–2005: Career with Blue
Ryan is a member of boy band Blue along with Simon Webbe, Duncan James and Antony Costa. The group has sold over 14 million records worldwide. In August 2005, Blue split up to pursue solo careers under the advice of Sir Elton John. Blue reformed on 28 April 2009.

Ryan has had three number one hits while with Blue. He had previously co-directed the video for Blue's single "Breathe Easy", which he also wrote and which was shot in Prague. In 2001 the group were in New York during the September 11 attacks after which Ryan commented that "This New York thing is being blown out of proportion" and asked "What about whales? They are ignoring animals that are more important. Animals need saving and that's more important." The other members of the group tried to silence Ryan, but he went on. This caused a huge media backlash that resulted in Blue losing a record deal in the United States and campaigns to sack Ryan from the line up.

2005–2008: Lee Ryan and stage

Ryan released his first single "Army of Lovers" in July 2005. It debuted at No. 3 in the UK Singles Chart and hit No. 1 in Italy. In August 2005, Ryan released his debut album, Lee Ryan, to mixed reviews. The album reached No. 6 in the UK Album Chart and No. 3 in Italy. "Turn Your Car Around" was the second single lifted from the album which had moderate success.  In January 2006, Ryan released his third and final single in the UK "When I Think of You". The song reached No. 15 in the UK. "Real Love" was used for the end credits of the film Ice Age: The Meltdown which later led to Ryan voicing the part of an elk in the UK version of the film and Eddie in the Italian version. In late 2005, Dolce & Gabbana signed Ryan up to be the UK face of their new line of clothing.

After the relative success of his first solo album, Ryan started planning his second solo album. The single "Reinforce Love" was released in December 2007. The single was being released for Great Ormond Street Hospital and CLIC Sargent, which were the two charities that Ryan was touring for in November and December 2007, with young voices. The album was then postponed, and finally cancelled. He appeared in the video for the single "Red Light" by a British girlband named Fe-Nix. In September 2007, he appeared as one of the contestants in Hell's Kitchen. However he rowed with Marco Pierre White about White's use of the term "pikey", and subsequently left the show. In August and September 2008, Ryan acted alongside Natalie Casey in The Pretender Agenda at The New Players Theatre in London. In June 2008 Ryan was found guilty of assaulting a taxi driver in Oxted and ordered to pay compensation to the victim.

2009–2010: Film and cancelled second album
In March 2010, Ryan confirmed that he had signed a new record deal with Geffen Records, due to last until 2013. Later that month, it was announced that Ryan's first album on his new record label, Confessions, was due to be released in October 2010. The first single from the album, "Secret Love", was released as a double A-Side with "I Am Who I Am" on 4 July 2010. The single peaked at number 33 on the UK Singles Chart. Following this, it was announced that Geffen were set to drop Ryan from the label, before work on his album had been completed. Ryan announced in January 2011 that there was no deal to release his album.

The track listing for Ryan's aborted album was as follows: "Secret Love", "I Am Who I Am", "Guardian Angel", "Perfect Strangers", "I Don't Wanna Let You Down", "I Love Your Smile", "It's Not Me", "Confessions", "Light of Your Soul", "Peaches", "Reinforce Love", "Suffice to Say", "To See the Stars", "Stop the Rain", "Why Me" and "Stand Up as People".

2011–2019: Blue return, EastEnders and Rip it Up

Ryan stated in January 2011 that he was working on an album with Blue to be released later in the year. Blue represented the United Kingdom at the Eurovision Song Contest 2011 in Düsseldorf, Germany with the song "I Can", placing 11th overall.

In 2013, Blue released "Hurt Lovers" the first single from their fourth album Roulette.

In August 2013, Ryan and Duncan James appeared in an episode of comedy panel show Through the Keyhole in which the host showed around their home in London.

Ryan appeared in Celebrity Big Brother 13 in 2014. Following the show he entered a relationship with fellow Big Brother participant Jasmine Waltz. Waltz split with Ryan a few weeks later claiming on Twitter that Ryan had cheated on her with a man. Ryan came out as bisexual during his time on Big Brother, later stating in an interview, "I'm very open about what I've done in the past but that was the easiest way to come out. I did so much other stuff that people didn't even notice." During his time on Big Brother Ryan admitted he sleeps with his Blue bandmate Duncan James stating, “I work with Duncan, I go on holiday with Duncan, I live with Duncan.” Asked: “Do you have sex with Duncan?”, he replied: “Yeah all the time".

In November 2014, Blue announced they had signed a two-album record deal with Sony Music. The band released their fifth studio album Colours on 9 March 2015. He was in Strictly Come Dancing 2018, but went out in the third round.

On 15 February 2017, it was confirmed that Ryan had landed a role in the BBC soap opera, EastEnders. He was cast as Woody Woodward, initially for a short stint between 18 April and 19 May. It was later announced that Woody would be promoted to a regular role and that Ryan had signed a one-year contract with the show. He later received 2017 Inside Soap Award nomination for Best Newcomer. Unsure his contract would be extended, Ryan signed to play Aladdin opposite Paul Merton’s Widow Twanky in panto in Wimbledon, and was hence written out of EastEnders.

In 2019, he was a candidate in the seventh season of the British reality TV-show Celebs Go Dating. From September to November 2019 Lee Ryan went on a UK-Tour with the musical "Rip it Up the 70s".

2021–present: Blue 20th anniversary
On 30 November 2021, the group confirmed they would be going on an arena tour to celebrate their 20th anniversary, it was also confirmed that Atomic Kitten would be supporting them on the tour. When interviewed on This Morning the group also confirmed that they were back in the studio recording, a new album is expected to follow along with the tour.

On 11 April 2022, the group announced that their sixth studio album Heart & Soul would be released on 9 September 2022. On 20 May, the group unveiled the track listing for the album on their social media accounts, following with first single "Haven't Found You Yet". On 29 June 2022, the group released the single "Dance with Me", a cover of the 2001 112 single.

Personal life
In August 2003, Ryan was arrested and charged with driving with excess alcohol in central London. In May 2004, Ryan was cleared of assaulting two photographers who had attempted to take photos of him leaving a nightclub, however he was convicted of criminal damage for smashing their cameras.

In August 2010, Ryan was charged with assaulting his former fiancée, but these charges were officially withdrawn.

In May 2014, Ryan pleaded guilty to criminal damage and failing to provide a specimen after being caught driving erratically in April.

When discussing sexuality and dating on Good Morning Britain in August 2019, Ryan was asked if he had dated men, to which he replied, "Yeah, I think a lot of people are a lot more liberal which is great for our society. I mean we aren't living in the Dark Ages any more and for people to have some kind of prejudice against these kinds of things is just ignorant".

On two occasions in 2020, Ryan was charged with driving a Mercedes at 70 mph in a 60 mph limit in Peterborough, but the charges were dismissed as the prosecution offered no evidence, due to there being no means of proving who was driving. However, Ryan was later charged and found guilty at trial of two counts of failing to provide information about the driver. At a subsequent hearing, Magistrate Alison Marsh gave Ryan two lots of six points against his driving licence, resulting in a disqualification from driving for 12 months. Fined £1,501 for one of the charges, Ryan, speaking via a remote link from Spain, said he was "out of work due to Covid" and "just don't have the money."

In January 2023, Ryan was convicted of four charges at Ealing Magistrates court. He had been found guilty of being drunk on an aircraft, assaulting a police officer and behaving in an abusive way towards a crew member, as well as a racially aggravated assault of a flight cabin crew member, which happened at London City Airport on July 31, 2022.

Discography

Studio albums

Singles

As lead artist

As featured artist

Filmography

See also
 List of Celebrity Big Brother (British TV series) housemates
 List of Strictly Come Dancing contestants

References

External links

Lee Ryan at the Unreality TV
Official Lee Ryan Instagram (@officialleeryan) • Instagram photos and videos
Lee Ryan

 
1983 births
Living people
Alumni of the Italia Conti Academy of Theatre Arts
Alumni of the Sylvia Young Theatre School
Blue (English band) members
21st-century English male singers
English male songwriters
Musicians from Kent
People from Chatham, Kent
English people of Irish descent
English soul singers
British contemporary R&B singers
British LGBT broadcasters
English LGBT songwriters
English LGBT singers
Bisexual songwriters
Bisexual singers
Bisexual male actors
English people convicted of assault
People convicted of racial hatred offences
British people convicted of hate crimes